Qazi Fazal Ullah  was a politician from Sindh, Pakistan.

Qazi Fazal Ullah was Chief Minister of Sindh from 8 May 1950 to 24 March 1951.

Chief Ministers of Sindh
Sindhi people
Possibly living people
Year of birth missing